I. F. B. Wickramanayake was the 29th Solicitor General of Sri Lanka. He was appointed on 1975, succeeding Shiva Pasupati, and held the office until 1977. He was succeeded by Elanga Wikramanayake.

References

W